In 1958, the United States FBI, under Director J. Edgar Hoover, continued for a ninth year to maintain a public list of the people it regarded as the Ten Most Wanted Fugitives.

As 1958 opened, the FBI had gone for a full ten months through the end of the prior year without being able to add a single fugitive to the top Ten list.  The reason for the paucity of new fugitives is that by March of the prior year, the list of Ten Fugitives had become entirely populated by the most difficult captures, all ten of whom still remained at large, up through the first three months of 1958:

 1950 #4 (eight years), Henry Randolph Mitchell, process was dismissed July 18, 1958
 1950 #14 (eight years), Frederick J. Tenuto, remained still at large
 1952 #36 (six years), James Eddie Diggs, remained still at large
 1954 #78 (four years), David Daniel Keegan, remained still at large
 1955 #83 (three years), Flenoy Payne, arrested March 11, 1958
 1955 #87 (three years), Daniel William O'Connor, apprehended December 26, 1958
 1956 #97 (two years), Eugene Francis Newman, remained still at large
 1956 #98 (two years), Carmine DiBiase, surrendered August 28, 1958
 1957 #99 (one year), Ben Golden McCollum, arrested March 7, 1958 
 1957 #102 (one year), George Edward Cole, remained still at large

But that situation was soon to change, as the FBI began one of its most productive years ever in 1958, in terms of removing long-timers from the top Ten list.  In all, a full half of the list, five long-time Fugitives, were removed from the list during 1958.

Also notable in 1958, the longest wanted Fugitive, Henry Randolph Mitchell, #4 from the original list of Ten published in 1950, after eight years at large, became the first Top Tenner to ever be removed for reason other than capture or death.  Mitchell became one of a series of longstanding top Ten Fugitives whose time on the list simply outlived their initial criteria for having been listed.  In the case of Mitchell, his charges were finally dropped by a court in 1958, and so the FBI also dropped him from the top Ten list with the justification that his "process was dismissed."  In many of the subsequent such removals, a top Ten Fugitive remained a fugitive from justice, yet was simply removed from the FBI top Ten list when the FBI determined that the original criteria were no longer being met for the top Ten listing.

With the removal of so many long-time top ten fugitives in 1958, the FBI once again began a series of turnover of many new Fugitives, adding a full half dozen new names to the list by year end.

1958 fugitives
The "Ten Most Wanted Fugitives" listed by the FBI in 1958 include (in FBI list appearance sequence order):

Eugene Russell McCracken
March 26, 1958 #103
One day on the list
Eugene Russell McCracken - U.S. prisoner arrested March 27, 1958 in Baltimore, Maryland by the FBI after McCracken's
photo was published in the Baltimore News-Post newspaper. Four separate individuals had called the FBI on the same day the newspaper article appeared.

Frank Aubrey Leftwich
April 4, 1958 #104
Two weeks on the list
Frank Aubrey Leftwich - U.S. prisoner arrested April 18, 1958 in Chicago, Illinois

Quay Cleon Kilburn
April 16, 1958 #105
Two months on the list, and later reappeared as Fugitive #188 in 1964
Quay Cleon Kilburn - later was wanted as Fugitive #188 in 1964; U.S. prisoner arrested June 2, 1958 in Los Angeles, California by the FBI after a citizen recognized him from an Identification Order in a local post office.  Kilburn was captured by FBI Special Agent Lewis G. Libby.

Dominick Scialo
May 9, 1958 #106
One year on the list
Dominick Scialo - U.S. prisoner surrendered July 27, 1959 to the FBI in Brooklyn, New York

Angelo Luigi Pero
June 16, 1958 #107
Two years on the list
Angelo Luigi Pero - PROCESS DISMISSED December 2, 1960 by the United States attorney in New York City

Frederick Grant Dunn
June 17, 1958 #108
One year on the list
Frederick Grant Dunn - FOUND DEAD September 8, 1959 by a farmer who located skeletal remains along a stream bank near Ellsworth, Kansas, and contacted the sheriff. The remains were sent to the FBI Lab and identified as Dunn.

Frank Lawrence Sprenz
September 10, 1958 #109
Seven months on the list
Frank Lawrence Sprenz - U.S. prisoner arrested April 15, 1959 in Laredo, Texas

Later entries
FBI Ten Most Wanted Fugitives, 2020s
FBI Ten Most Wanted Fugitives, 2010s
FBI Ten Most Wanted Fugitives, 2000s
FBI Ten Most Wanted Fugitives, 1990s
FBI Ten Most Wanted Fugitives, 1980s
FBI Ten Most Wanted Fugitives, 1970s
FBI Ten Most Wanted Fugitives, 1960s
FBI Ten Most Wanted Fugitives, 1950s

External links
Current FBI top ten most wanted fugitives at FBI site
FBI pdf source document listing all Ten Most Wanted year by year (removed by FBI)

1958 in the United States